Mario Sepúlveda may refer to:

 Mario Sepúlveda Palma (born 1972), Chilean mountain climber and ski mountaineer
 Mario Sepúlveda (born 1970), Chilean miner capitain who held the miners together  and members of the trapped group in the 2010 Copiapó mining accident